Gabriela Schloesser ( Bayardo, born 18 February 1994) is a Mexican-born Dutch recurve archer from Tijuana who represented Mexico before 2016, and has represented the Netherlands since 2017. In 2021, Schloesser and Steve Wijler won the silver medal in the mixed team event at the 2020 Summer Olympics in Tokyo, Japan.

Career
She competed for Mexico in the archery competition at the 2016 Summer Olympics in Rio de Janeiro, reaching the second round before being eliminated by Lisa Unruh of Germany. Following the mandatory break of 12 months in international competition for athletes switching national representation, Schloesser made her debut as a Dutch archer at the third stage of the Archery World Cup in June 2018.

In June 2019, partnered with Sjef van den Berg, Schloesser won silver medal in the mixed recurve event at the Archery World Championships in 's-Hertogenbosch, losing to the South Korean duo of Lee Woo-seok and Kang Chae-young in the final. Later that month at the 2019 European Games held in Minsk, Belarus, Bayardo secured a qualification place for the 2020 Summer Olympics in Tokyo after reaching the semi-finals, becoming the first female Dutch archer to achieve an Olympic spot since 1996. Although she lost to Tatiana Andreoli of Italy in their semi-final match, Schloesser claimed bronze medal after defeating Russia's Anna Balsukova in the third-place match.

On 23 May 2021, she paired with Sjef van den Berg to claim gold medal in the recurve mixed team event during the 2021 Archery World Cup defeating the Bangladeshi duo of Diya Siddique and Ruman Shana in the final.

Schloesser and Rick van der Ven won the gold medal in the mixed team recurve event at the 2022 European Archery Championships held in Munich, Germany. She represented the Netherlands at the 2022 World Games held in Birmingham, United States.

References

External links
 

Mexican female archers
Dutch female archers
Living people
Place of birth missing (living people)
1994 births
Archers at the 2016 Summer Olympics
Archers at the 2020 Summer Olympics
Olympic archers of Mexico
Olympic archers of the Netherlands
Sportspeople from Tijuana
Archers at the 2019 European Games
European Games medalists in archery
European Games bronze medalists for the Netherlands
World Archery Championships medalists
Olympic silver medalists for the Netherlands
Medalists at the 2020 Summer Olympics
Olympic medalists in archery
Mexican people of Dutch descent
Competitors at the 2022 World Games